Phillip Sue (born 3 September 1946) is a New Zealand weightlifter. He competed in the men's lightweight event at the 1976 Summer Olympics.

References

1946 births
Living people
New Zealand male weightlifters
Olympic weightlifters of New Zealand
Weightlifters at the 1976 Summer Olympics
Sportspeople from Hastings, New Zealand
Commonwealth Games medallists in weightlifting
Commonwealth Games bronze medallists for New Zealand
Weightlifters at the 1974 British Commonwealth Games
Weightlifters at the 1978 Commonwealth Games
Weightlifters at the 1982 Commonwealth Games
20th-century New Zealand people
21st-century New Zealand people
Medallists at the 1978 Commonwealth Games